Pietro Fiocchi (born 22 May 1964, Milan) is an Italian Entrepreneur and politician. 

After graduating in aerospace engineering at the University of Missouri of Rolla, in 1990 he entered the Navy, serving as a Sub-lieutenant on the San Giorgio landing ship until 1992 and working with the San Marco Battalion and with the Comsubin, an Italian special forces department.

After two years in the navy he began his professional activity as technical director at Ravasi Robotics, an Italian robotics company, and later as manager and technical director at Fiocchi Munizioni. In 1998 he became president and member of the board of directors of Fiocchi of America. In 2007 he founded Fiocchi UK, while in 2015 he became a member of the Board of Directors of Target, a New Zealand company producing hunting and shooting cartridges.

In 2019 he was elected as a member of the European Parliament on the Brothers of Italy list.

References

Living people
1964 births
MEPs for Italy 2019–2024
Missouri University of Science and Technology alumni
Brothers of Italy MEPs
Brothers of Italy politicians
Businesspeople from Milan
Politicians from Milan